Diwan Bahadur Lewis Dominic Swamikannu Pillai CIE, ISO  (b. 11 February 1865 - d. 10 September 1925) was an Indian politician, historian, linguist, astronomer and administrator who served as the second President of the Madras Legislative Council.

Life 

Swamikannu Pillai was born in a poor Indian Christian family of Madras Presidency on 11 February 1865.

Pillai had his schooling in Madras and graduated in law before doing his LlB.

When the then President of the Madras Legislative Council, P.Rajagopalachari resigned his post in 1924 to join the India Council, elections were held for the post of President. In February 1925, Swamikannu Pillai took charge as the first elected President of the Madras Legislative Council.

During his tenure as President of the Madras Legislative Council, Pillai created the Legislative Council library.

In his honour, the LD Swamikannu Pillai Endowment Lectures in philosophy were later established at the University of Madras. Some of the major figures in comparative philosophy, such as Klaus Klostermaier, Ignatius Puthiadam, Richard De Smet, Ignatius Hirudayam, Jean de Marneffe, Ignatius Viyagappa, Bede Griffiths, William Sweet, and George F. McLean, have been invited to deliver these lectures.

Death 
Swamikannu Pillai died on 10 September 1925 at 7.00 PM at his house in Royapuram. He was sixty years old at that time.

Honours 

Swamikannu Pillai was made a "Diwan Bahadur", appointed a Companion of the Imperial Service Order in 1917 and finally appointed a Companion of the Order of the Indian Empire in the 1924 New Year Honours' List.

Works

Notes

References 

 

1865 births
1925 deaths
Indian Roman Catholics
Companions of the Order of the Indian Empire
19th-century Indian historians
20th-century Indian historians